Sem Sæland (17 April 1874 – 25 April 1940) was a Norwegian physicist. He was a physics Professor at the Norwegian Institute of Technology (NTH) from 1910, and at the University of Oslo from 1922. He served as rector of the University of Oslo from 1927 to 1936. Sæland was a Commander of the Royal Norwegian Order of St. Olav, a Grand Knight of the Order of the Falcon, and a Commander of the Order of the Crown of Italy.

References

1874 births
1940 deaths
Academic staff of the University of Oslo
Rectors of the University of Oslo
Grand Knights of the Order of the Falcon